Hollywood Park may refer to:

Places

United States
Hollywood Memorial Park Cemetery in Los Angeles, California
Hollywood Park, Chicago, a neighborhood in North Park, Chicago, Illinois
Hollywood Park, Inglewood, an entertainment complex and master-planned neighborhood in Inglewood, California
Hollywood Park Casino
Hollywood Park Racetrack, a former thoroughbred racetrack and the site of the new neighborhood
Hollywood Park, Sacramento, a neighborhood in Sacramento, California
Hollywood Park, Texas, a town in Bexar County surrounded by the City of San Antonio, Texas
Hollywood Park Racetrack (New Jersey), a former thoroughbred racetrack in West End, Monmouth County
Lake Hollywood Park, surrounding the Hollywood Reservoir, Hollywood Hills, Los Angeles, California

Worldwide
Hollywood Park, Barrow, retail and leisure complex in Cumbria, England

Music
Hollywood Park (album), 2021 studio album by The Airborne Toxic Event

See also 
 Hollywood (disambiguation)